KSOW may refer to:

 KSOW-LP, a radio station in Oregon, United States
 Show Low Regional Airport (ICAO code KSOW)